The Stone may refer to:

Music

The Stone (music space), an experimental music space in New York City
The Stone (San Francisco), a music club at 412 Broadway, San Francisco
"The Stone" (Ashes Divide song)
"The Stone" (Dave Matthews Band song)
The Stone (band), a Serbian black metal band
The Stone (Babble album)
The Stone (Milford Graves and Bill Laswell album)

Other
The Stone (online game), an online puzzle game
The Stone (1977 film), a 1977 Azerbaijani film
The Stone (2013 film), a 2013 South Korean film
The Stone (blog), the New York Times philosophy blog
"The Stone", an episode of the cartoon Kidd Video

See also
Stone (disambiguation)
Stones (disambiguation)
The Stones (disambiguation)